Café Coco is a 24-hour cafe located at 210 Louise Avenue near Elliston Place in Nashville, Tennessee.  During the day it is primarily a coffee shop, and at night it has live music, poetry, and comedy. It is one of Nashville's few non-chain 24-hour food establishments.

The menu includes sandwiches, pasta, burgers, salad, pizza, cake, beer, coffee, and drinks.  Wi-fi is available for free.  College students and rappers frequent the cafe, and the cafe patio is often used by smoking patrons.

The restaurant was also briefly Italian...

The cafe was founded in 1995 by and was co-owned by Coco Vallis and still is owned by former New Yorker Chuck Cinelli (a third generation restaurateur), who are husband and wife.

References

External links
Café Coco website
Facebook page
Review in the Nashville Scene

Restaurants in Nashville, Tennessee
Restaurants established in 1995
1995 establishments in Tennessee
Music venues in Tennessee